Permutation codes are a family of error correction codes that were introduced first by Slepian in 1965. and have been widely studied both in Combinatorics and Information theory due to their applications related to Flash memory and Power-line communication.

Definition and properties 
A permutation code  is defined as a subset of the Symmetric Group in  endowed with the usual Hamming distance between strings of length .

The minimum distance of a permutation code  is defined to be the minimum positive integer  such that there exist   , distinct, such that .

One of the reasons why permutation codes are suitable for certain channels is that the alphabet symbols only appear once in each codeword, which for example makes the errors occurring in the context of powerline communication less impactful on codewords

Gilbert-Varshamov bound 

Theorem 1: 

There has been improvements on it for the case where   as the next theorem shows.

Theorem 2: If  for some integer , then

.

References

Error detection and correction